Elizabeth Joyce "Joy" Grieveson (born 31 October 1941) from Darlington, United Kingdom, is a retired track and field athlete.

Athletics career
She won the silver medal in the women's 400 metres at the 1962 European Athletics Championships in Belgrade, Yugoslavia, having taken a week's leave from work to compete. She came in behind Maria Itkina of the Soviet Union, and ahead of Tilly van der Made of the Netherlands.

She represented England in the 220 and 880 yards, at the 1962 British Empire and Commonwealth Games in Perth, Western Australia.

She also represented Great Britain in the 1964 Tokyo Olympics, and was one of the favourites, but a hamstring injury hampered her chances and she only reached the semi-final. She retired from athletics after her second Commonwealth Games where she competed in the 440 yards at the 1966 Commonwealth Games.

Personal life
She married Darlington F.C. footballer Stan Watson.

References

1941 births
Living people
English female sprinters
Olympic athletes of Great Britain
Athletes (track and field) at the 1964 Summer Olympics
European Athletics Championships medalists
Athletes (track and field) at the 1962 British Empire and Commonwealth Games
Athletes (track and field) at the 1966 British Empire and Commonwealth Games
Sportspeople from Darlington
Commonwealth Games competitors for England
Olympic female sprinters